Chloroacetic acid, industrially known as monochloroacetic acid (MCA), is the organochlorine compound with the formula ClCH2CO2H. This carboxylic acid is a useful building block in organic synthesis. It is a colorless solid.  Related compounds are dichloroacetic acid and trichloroacetic acid.

Production
Chloroacetic acid was first prepared (in impure form) by the French chemist Félix LeBlanc (1813–1886) in 1843 by chlorinating acetic acid in the presence of sunlight, and in 1857 (in pure form) by the German chemist Reinhold Hoffmann (1831–1919) by refluxing glacial acetic acid in the presence of chlorine and sunlight, and then by the French chemist Charles Adolphe Wurtz by hydrolysis of chloroacetyl chloride (ClCH2COCl), also in 1857.

Chloroacetic acid is prepared industrially by two routes. The predominant method involves chlorination of acetic acid, with acetic anhydride as a catalyst:
    +  →   + 

This route suffers from the production of dichloroacetic acid and trichloroacetic acid as impurities, which are difficult to separate by distillation:
  + 2  →  + 2 
  + 3  →   + 3 

The second method entails hydrolysis of trichloroethylene:
  + 2  →  + 2 

The hydrolysis is conducted at 130–140 °C in a concentrated (at least 75%) solution of sulfuric acid. This method produces a highly pure product, unlike the halogenation route. However, the significant quantities of HCl released have led to the increased popularity of the halogenation route. Approximately 420,000 tonnes are produced globally per year.

Uses and reactions
Most reactions take advantage of the high reactivity of the C–Cl bond. 

In its largest-scale application, chloroacetic acid is used to prepare the thickening agent carboxymethyl cellulose and carboxymethyl starch.

Chloroacetic acid is also used in the production of phenoxy herbicides by etherification with chlorophenols. In this way 2-methyl-4-chlorophenoxyacetic acid (MCPA), 2,4-dichlorophenoxyacetic acid, and 2,4,5-trichlorophenoxyacetic acid (2,4,5-T) are produced.  It is the precursor to the herbicide glyphosate and dimethoate. Chloroacetic acid is converted to chloroacetyl chloride, a precursor to adrenaline (epinephrine). Displacement of chloride by sulfide gives thioglycolic acid, which is used as a stabilizer in PVC and a component in some cosmetics.

Illustrative of its usefulness in organic chemistry is the O-alkylation of salicylaldehyde with chloroacetic acid, followed by decarboxylation of the resulting ether, producing benzofuran.

Safety
Like other chloroacetic acids and related halocarbons, chloroacetic acid is a hazardous alkylating agent. The  for rats is 76 mg/kg.

It is classified as an extremely hazardous substance in the United States as defined in Section 302 of the U.S. Emergency Planning and Community Right-to-Know Act (42 U.S.C. 11002), and is subject to strict reporting requirements by facilities which produce, store, or use it in significant quantities.

See also
Fluoroacetic acid

References

External links

Acetic acids
Alkylating agents
Organochlorides
Organic compounds with 2 carbon atoms